The Erie-built was the first streamlined, cab-equipped dual service diesel locomotive built by Fairbanks-Morse, introduced as direct competition to such models as the ALCO PA and FA and EMD FT. F-M lacked the space and staff to design and manufacture large road locomotives in their own plant at Beloit, Wisconsin, and was concerned that waiting to develop the necessary infrastructure would cause them to miss out on the market opportunity for large road locomotives. Engineering and assembly work was subcontracted out to General Electric, which produced the locomotives at its Erie, Pennsylvania, facility, thereby giving rise to the name "Erie-built."

At the time, diesel road power was sold as multi-unit locomotives. This allowed the Erie-Built to deliver a  locomotive consisting of only three units, versus four units for the  EMD FT and  ALCO FA. The locomotive was too heavy for a four-axle  wheel arrangement, and had to be fitted with idler axles. The A1A-A1A wheel arrangement enabled the Erie-Built to meet axle-load limitations while maintaining the simplicity and lower cost of a four-motor transmission, though it meant the Erie-Built was more prone to wheelslip than the FT.

F-M retained the services of renowned industrial designer Raymond Loewy to create a visually impressive car body for the Erie-built. The initial windshield configuration utilized rectangular glass panes, whereas those units manufactured after March, 1947 received windshields with a curved upper contour. 

The Union Pacific Railroad bought the first A-B-A set, which was delivered in December 1945. Subsequent engine troubles and a nine-month strike at the Beloit plant made it difficult to get repeat orders. The largest order came in 1947, when the Pennsylvania Railroad ordered 16 three-unit A-B-A sets. Kansas City Southern Railway ordered a four-unit, A-B-B-A set to run long trains at faster speed. However, the resulting slack action on trains spanning several up-and-down gradients resulted in an excess of broken draft gear. KCS bought five more units to reconfigure its Erie-Builts to  A-B-A sets.

Most units rode on conventional General Steel Castings trucks, which looked similar to those used on the Alco PA but were actually a different design. This drove up the cost as it required new foundry patterns. GE design a welded truck that could be fabricated at the Erie plant, and was fitted to a number of units for UP, KCS, and NYC. However, most customers preferred the cast steel truck, and the engineering cost, jigs and fixtures and necessity for a second inventory meant that the fabricated truck design did not save money

The Erie-Builts soon ran into problems with the OP engine that had not been experienced in Navy service. The 38D 8-1/8 engine as configured for the Erie-Builts Brake Mean Effective Pressure of 95.2 psi, as opposed to the 85 psi rating for Navy engines and 77 to 86.7 for the EMD 567 as used in the E7, FT and F3. Submarines gave the engines access to cool, sea-level air, but on Western railroads like UP, the engines were operating under load at high altitude, high temperature, and low humidity, and often in the wake of waste heat from leading locomotives. Locomotives had closed-loop cooling systems while submarines drew cooling water from the sea. No FM OP powered submarines used open loop cooling systems. Open loop cooling systems were discontinued prior to WWII. They did use a heat exchanger cooled by sea water, but it was still a closed system. The OP engine had no head, and its exhaust ports were uncovered by the lower pistons. This resulted in excessive lower-piston temperatures, and under heavy load this led to piston failure, which could then cause cylinder liner damage and a possible crankcase explosion. F-M immediately attempted to address the problem but it was seven to eight years before a piston was developed that could stand up to railroad service.

Replacement of a single power assembly (cylinder liner and its two pistons) required moving the locomotive under a crane and removing (and later reinstalling) the locomotive's roof hatch, upper crankcase, upper caps, upper connecting rod caps, and upper crankshaft, making the operation much more time- and resource-intensive than a power assembly change on other engine types. Fairbanks-Morse learned that in shops that maintained multiple locomotive types, where the foreman was under pressure to repair as many locomotives as possible, repair of OP engines that required extensive disassembly was often delayed in favor of other types of locomotives that could be turned around more quickly.

F-M ceased production of the Erie-Built in 1949, due largely to the difficulty of building it at a profit. It was determined that even if production was moved to Beloit, the high cost of items like the GE 746 traction motor (which was more expensive than the GE 752 used by the Alco PA), the unique cast and fabricate trucks, a secondary electrical power system for radiator fans and traction motor blowers, and a secondary cooling system for the lube oil (a Navy requirement), made the Erie-Builts too expensive to build.

82 cab-equipped lead A units and 29 cabless booster B units were built for American railroads between December 1945 and April 1949. Afterward, F-M continued to market dual service streamlined units under its Consolidated line of locomotives, more commonly referred to as "C-liners".

No FM Erie-Built units are known to survive today.

CP Rail use
After their retirement, four former Pennsylvania Railroad Erie-built B unit hulks were sent to the Canadian Pacific Railway where they were incorporated into a quasi-portable CWR rail welding plant located at Smiths Falls, Ontario. These units were painted in a unique paint scheme almost identical to the Erie Lackawanna Railway's but with Canadian Pacific lettering; these units having been acquired immediately prior to the CPR adopting the red and white CP Rail multi-mark paint scheme. Around 1990, the CWR plant with the Erie-Built hulks were moved from Smiths Falls to a CP yard in the Transcona neighbourhood of Winnipeg, Manitoba in preparation for scrapping. Three sets of trucks from the Erie-Built hulks were salvaged and sent to Oregon, with two being placed under two truckless ex-D&H/ATSF Alco-GE PA-1s that were returned from Mexico, while an unused spare set was stored and eventually scrapped. One Erie-built CWR car did avoid the initial scrapping of the plant in 1994 but was later scrapped separately in 2010.

Units produced

A units (cabs)

B units (cabless boosters)

  *Note: Union Pacific cab/booster/cab set 700 / 700B / 701 was originally Fairbanks-Morse demonstrator set 50-M-1A / 50-M-3B / 50-M-2A; became 981A / 983B / 982A in 1947, then 700 / 700B / 701 in 1948. Cab/booster sets 702 / 702B and 703 / 703B delivered as 984A / 986B and 985A / 987B.

See also
 ALCO PA and FA, styling of which was inspired by the Erie-built

References

 
 
 
 
  Dates and roadnumbers of EMD repowered Erie builts

Further reading

External links
 Fairbanks-Morse Erie-Built Roster

A1A-A1A locomotives
Erie-built
Passenger locomotives
Diesel locomotives of the United States
Railway locomotives introduced in 1945
Locomotives with cabless variants
Scrapped locomotives
Standard gauge locomotives of the United States
Streamlined diesel locomotives
General Electric locomotives